Agrani Bank Ltd. SC is a football team from Dhaka, Bangladesh. It is currently a team of Bangladesh Championship League (BCL). This club is owned by a Bangladeshi bank known as Agrani Bank Limited.

Current squad
Agrani Bank Ltd. SC squad for 2020–21 season.

Head coach

References

Football clubs in Bangladesh
Sport in Dhaka
Bangladesh Championship League